William Grover may refer to:
 William N. Grover, American attorney acquitted of murdering Joseph Smith, Jr.
 William Grover-Williams (born William Charles Frederick Grover), British-French racing driver and World War II spy

See also